The Paniai Lakes languages, also known as the Wissel Lakes or Wissel Lakes – Kemandoga River, are a small family of closely related Trans–New Guinea languages spoken in the Paniai Lakes region of the highlands of Western New Guinea in the Paniai Lakes region of Papua. Foley (2003) considers their Trans–New Guinea status to be established.

Languages
The languages are:
 
Moni
Central
Wolani (Wodani)
Ekari (Ekari) 
Auye (incl. Dao)

They are most closely related to the Dani languages, Amung and Dem.

Pronouns
Independent pronouns and possessive prefixes are:

{| class="wikitable"
! !!singular!!dual!!plural
|-
!1
|*ani, *na-||*ina||*ini, *ni-
|-
!2
|*aka, *ka-||*ika||*iki
|-
!3
|*oka, *e-
|}

Vocabulary comparison
The following basic vocabulary words are from Larson & Larson (1972) and Voorhoeve (1975), as cited in the Trans-New Guinea database:

{| class="wikitable sortable"
! gloss !! Ekari (Paniai Lake dialect) !! Ekari !! Moni (Kemandoga dialect) !! Moni !! Wolani (Upper Mbijandoga dialect) !! Wolani
|-
! head
|  || migo ||  || muŋagi ||  || moto
|-
! hair
|  || iyo ||  || mbagu ||  || elo
|-
! eye
|  || peka ||  || seŋgamu ||  || 
|-
! nose
| juma ||  || jange ||  || juma || 
|-
! tooth
| egó || ego || baga || baga || hego || hego
|-
! tongue
| etá ||  || dabe ||  || debegada || 
|-
! leg
|  ||  ||  || bado ||  || bado
|-
! louse
| uka || uka || amu || amu || uka || uka
|-
! dog
|  || dodi ||  || home ||  || kawino
|-
! pig
|  || ekina ||  || wogo ||  || iŋgina
|-
! bird
| bedo || bedo || beka || bega || bido || bido
|-
! egg
|  || nipo ||  || ŋgeda ||  || 
|-
! blood
| emo || emo || eka || ega || emo || emo
|-
! bone
| mitoo || mitoo || iwa || iwa || mitoo || mitoo
|-
! skin
| kadó || kado || ada || ada || ebada || ebada
|-
! breast
| ama ||  || ama ||  || ama || 
|-
! tree
| pija || piya || bo || bo || pija || piya
|-
! man
| jame || yame || aka || me || me || me
|-
! sun
| meuka; tani || tani || emondani || emondani || dame || dame
|-
! moon
| agoo ||  || tinawi ||  || agoo || 
|-
! water
| uwo || uwo || du || du || uwo || uwo
|-
! fire
| bodija || bodiya || usa || usa || bida || bida
|-
! stone
| mogo || mogo || homa || ŋeda || huma || huma
|-
! road, path
| itá ||  || kejako ||  || hindá || 
|-
! name
| eka || eka || eje || eze || ekada || ekada
|-
! eat
| nai || nai || nuija || nuya || nona || nona
|-
! one
| ena; kate || ena; kato || hako || hago || naa || naa
|-
! two
| wijá || wiya || hija || hiya || wijá || wiya
|}

Evolution
Paniai Lakes reflexes of proto-Trans-New Guinea (pTNG) etyma are:

Ekari language:
 ‘breast’ < 
 ‘arm’ < 
 ‘belly’ < 
 ‘breast’ < 
 ‘skin’ < 
 ‘louse’ < 
 ‘come’ < 
 ‘father’ < 
 ‘speech, talk’ <  ‘instructions’
 ‘sun’ < 

Moni language:
 ‘breast’ < 
 ‘heart’ <  ‘internal organs, belly’
 ‘skin’ < 
 ‘woman’ < 
 ‘night’ < 
 ‘stone’ < 
 ‘tree’ < 
 ‘come’ <

References

 
Languages of western New Guinea
West Papuan Highlands languages